Sri Ramakrishna P. U. College or Sri Ramakrishna Pre-university College is an undergraduate college located at Bunts Hostel Circle, Mangalore, Karnataka, India. The college was established in 1992 by the Bunts alias Nadavara Mathr Sangha. The current principal of the college is Dr. Kishore Kumar Rai Sheni.

Courses 
The college offers undergraduate courses in science, arts, and commerce. The commerce stream includes subjects like Economics, Business-studies, Economics, Accountancy, and science stream include subject combination like PMCB (Physics, Chemistry, Mathematics, Biology), PCMCS (Physics, Chemistry, mathematics, Computer Science) etc. The college has

References 

Educational institutions established in 1992
Universities and colleges in Mangalore
1992 establishments in Karnataka